"The South's Gonna Do It (Again)", is a song written and performed by the Charlie Daniels Band and released on their 1974 album Fire on the Mountain.

Content
The lyrics refer to several Southern rock bands and musicians:
 Grinderswitch
 The Marshall Tucker Band
 Lynyrd Skynyrd
 Dickey Betts (guitarist with The Allman Brothers)
 Elvin Bishop
 ZZ Top
 Wet Willie
 Barefoot Jerry
 Charlie Daniels Band

The first line in the song is also a play on Grinder's Switch, Tennessee, the fictional hometown of Grand Ole Opry star Minnie Pearl.

The song uses a clever play on words to promote Southern rock music.  The notion that "the South shall rise again" was a familiar sentiment and rallying cry for disaffected Southern whites after the American Civil War. The song co-opts that sentiment, but uses the statement to celebrate Southern rock acts contemporary to the song itself.  The "it" that the South is going to do again, it is implied, is to produce additional popular rock groups.

Daniels factually bristled at more nefarious interpretations of what the "it" was. When the Ku Klux Klan used the song as background music for radio commercials for a 1975 rally in Louisiana, Daniels told Billboard, "I'm damn proud of the South, but I sure as hell am not proud of the Ku Klux Klan. I wrote the song about the land I love and my brothers. It was not written to promote hate groups."

Chart performance

References

External links
 

Fire On The Mountain track listing

1975 singles
Charlie Daniels songs
Songs written by Charlie Daniels
1974 songs
Songs about the American South
Country rock songs
Southern rock songs